The Furnas Dam is a hydroelectric dam in the Minas Gerais state of Brazil. A small settlement was built near the dam with the same name to house the workers during the dam construction. The main purpose of the dam and reservoir are the production of electricity and the regulation of the flow of the Grande River. Near the beginning of 2022, mass amounts of rain caused a large rock to fall and kill 10 people.

Construction
Construction on the dam began in 1957 and was the first large dam in Brazil. It was built by Wimpey Construction and was completed in 1963. It is built on the canyon of the Grande River, before joining the Sapucaí River downstream.

See also

List of power stations in Brazil
Capitólio rockfall

References

External links 

 All about Furnas
 History of Furnas

Dams completed in 1963
Dams in Minas Gerais
Dams on the Rio Grande (Paraná River tributary)
Energy infrastructure completed in 1963
Hydroelectric power stations in Brazil